Isakovskaya is a rural locality (a village) in Tarnogskoye Rural Settlement, Tarnogsky District, Vologda Oblast, Russia. The population was 45 as of 2002.

Geography 
Isakovskaya is located 7 km northwest of Tarnogsky Gorodok (the district's administrative centre) by road. Shkulevskaya is the nearest rural locality.

References 

Rural localities in Tarnogsky District